El Puente is the capital of the municipality of Guriezo (Cantabria, Spain). In 2008 it had a population of 535 inhabitants (INE). The town is located 40 meters above sea level, and is 67.5 miles away from the Cantabrian capital Santander.

Towns in Spain
Populated places in Cantabria